Imeni Kirova, Azerbaijan may refer to:

 Bankə - formerly, Imeni Kirova
 Yeni Suraxanı - formerly, Imeni Kirova
 Kirov, Baku - formerly, Imeni Kirova